Jake Forbes may refer to:

Jake Forbes (ice hockey) (1897–1985), Canadian ice hockey player
Jake T. Forbes (born 1977), American editor